is railway station on the Kyūdai Main Line operated by JR Kyūshū, in Ukiha, Fukuoka Prefecture, Japan.

Lines 
Only local trains on the line stop at the station.

Layout 
The station consists of a side platform serving a single track at grade with a siding. A wooden building has been set up by the local municipal authorities as a waiting room and a bike shed is provided outside. The station is unstaffed but some types of tickets are available from a kan'i itaku agent from a shop near the station.

Adjacent stations

History
In the second phase of expansion, the track was extended east, with Chikugo-Ōishi opening as the new eastern terminus on 11 July 1931. With the privatization of Japanese National Railways (JNR), the successor of JGR, on 1 April 1987, JR Kyushu took over control of the station.

Passenger statistics
In fiscal 2009, the station was used by a daily average of 320 passengers (boarding and disembarking).

In fiscal 2016, the number of passengers (boarding only) using the station was between 100 and 322. The station did not rank among the top 300 busiest stations of JR Kyushu.

References

External links
Chikugo-Ōishi (JR Kyushu)

Railway stations in Fukuoka Prefecture
Railway stations in Japan opened in 1931